The 1955 Oklahoma A&M Cowboys football team represented Oklahoma Agricultural and Mechanical College (later renamed Oklahoma State University–Stillwater) in the Missouri Valley Conference during the 1955 college football season. In their first season under head coach Cliff Speegle, the Cowboys compiled a 2–8 record (1–3 against conference opponents), tied for last place in the conference, and were outscored by opponents by a combined total of 172 to 88.

On offense, the 1955 team averaged 8.8 points scored, 144.1 rushing yards, and 81.7 passing yards per game.  On defense, the team allowed an average of 17.2 points scored, 237.5 rushing yards and 64.8 passing yards per game. The team's statistical leaders included fullback Earl Lunsford with 596 rushing yards and 30 points scored, Tom Pontius with 764 passing yards, and Chester Spencer with 319 receiving yards.

End Chester Spencer received first-team All-Missouri Valley Conference honors.

The team played its home games at Lewis Field in Stillwater, Oklahoma.

Schedule

After the season

The 1956 NFL Draft was held on January 17–18, 1956. The following Cowboys were selected.

References

Oklahoma AandM
Oklahoma State Cowboys football seasons
Oklahoma AM